Isuf Dibra (Dohoshisht ? – Tirana, March 19, 1927) was an Albanian politician who served as Minister of War in the Toptani Government.

Biography
Isuf Dibra was born in the village of Dohoshisht, present day Dibër County. Little information is known about his life, including the exact year of his birth. He attended the elementary ruşdiye school in Manastir.
As the leader of a guerrilla force of roughly 5,000 mercenaries, he helped Essad Toptani seize power in the fall of 1914. For his efforts, in the form of gratitude, Essad Pasha named him Minister of War in his newly formed cabinet.
Dibra was appointed as an unelected member of the senate in the Constitutional Assembly on
18 December 1926, replacing the ousted senator Eqrem Vlora who had not participated in the works of the senate for two months.
The following year, on March 19, 1927, he was murdered in Tirana by his assistant under unknown circumstances. The printed press at the time reported that Dibra received a state funeral on March 22 and the procession speech was given by fellow senator Pilo Papa.

References

Government ministers of Albania
Defence ministers of Albania
People from Dibër (municipality)
Albanian politicians

Year of birth missing
1927 deaths